This is a list of notable Oirats:

Political figures
Khutuga bekhi, leader of the Oirats (late 12th century – early 13th century)
Al-Adil Kitbugha 10th Mamluk Sultan of Egypt from December 1294 to November 1296
Vladimir Lenin
Ilya Ulyanov

Leaders of Four Oirat 
Üylintey Badan (c. 1368 – 1390s)
Khuuhai Dayuu (c. 1399)
Ugetchi Khashikha (Mongolian: Ögöchi Khashikha; Mönkhtömör)
Batula Chinsan (Bahamu, Mahamud) (1399–1408)
Esehü (Taipin) (c. 1424)
Togoon (1408–1438) (Toghan)
Esen (1438–1454)
Amasanj (1454–1455)
Ishtömör (Ush-Temür, Ish-Temür) (1455–1469)
Khishig
Arkhan
Büüvei
Khongor; Khan Khongor noyon; title: noyon
Abai khatan
Kharkhul — 1600–1634

Leaders of the Zunghar Khanate
 Erdeni Batur —1634–1653
 Sengge — 1653–1671
 Galdan Boshughtu Khan — 1671–1697
 Tsewang Rabtan — 1697–1727
 Galdan Tseren — 1727–1745
 Tsewang Dorji — 1745–1750
 Lama Dorji — 1750–1752
 Dawachi — 1752–1755

Khans of the Kalmyk Khanate
Kho Orluk
Shukhur Daichin — 1654–1661
Puntsug (Monchak) — 1661–1669
Ayuka Khan — 1669–1724
Tseren Donduk Khan — 1724–1735
Donduk Ombo Khan — 1735–1741
Donduk Dashi Khan — 1741–1761
Ubashi Khan — 1761–1771

Khans of the Khoshut Khanate
Güshi Khan — 1642–1655
Dayan Ochirtu Khan — 1655–1670
Puntsug Dalai Khan — 1670–1697
Wangjil Khan — 1697–1700
Lha-bzang Khan — 1700–1717

Notable Kalmyk religious leaders

Šajin Lama of the Kalmyk people
Chimid Balzanov
Lubsan Sharab Tepkin
Erdne Ombadykow

Lama of the Don Kalmyks
Djimba Gandjinov
Koti Badjuginov
Arkad Chubanov
Djimba Mikulinov
Boka Kuliushov
Menko Bormanzhinov
Shurguchi Nimgirov
Ivan Bultinovich Kitanov

Other notable Kalmyk Lamas
Gavi Djimba Manchuda Burinov
Zobda Buruldinov
Ja Lama
Namjal Nimbushev
Zaya Pandit
Dordji Setenov
Dambo Ulianov
Ngawang Wangyal
Sandji Yavanov

Notable Kalmyk military officers 
Oka Gorodovikov
Lavr Kornilov

Fictional 
Ivan Skavinsky Skavar, a character in William Percy French's song, Abdul Abulbul Amir

Sportspeople
Tömöriin Artag — wrestler for Mongolia, Mongolian national wrestler, freestyle wrestler, 1968 Summer Olympics bronze medalist.
Batu Khasikov — kickboxer for Russia, Kalmyk, kickboxing champion of 2010 and 2012 (World Association of Kickboxing Organizations); International Sport Karate Association's champion of 2007.
Khorloogiin Bayanmönkh — wrestler for Mongolia, Durvud, Mongolian national wrestler, freestyle wrestler, sambo wrestler, 1972 Summer Olympics silver medalist, 1975 World Wrestling Championships gold medalist,  1974 World Sambo Championships gold medalist.
Liudmila Bodnieva — handball player for Russia, Kalmyk, 2001 and 2005 World Women's Handball Championship's gold medalist.
Sainjargalyn Nyam-Ochir — judoka for Mongolia, 2012 Summer Olympics bronze medalist.
Mingiyan Semenov — Greco-Roman wrestler for Russia, Kalmyk, 2012 Summer Olympics bronze medalist, 2014 World Wrestling Championships silver medalist.
Khashbaataryn Tsagaanbaatar — judoka for Mongolia, 2004 Summer Olympics bronze medalist, 2009 World Judo Championships gold medalist.

Others 
Dambyn Tsembel (1945-2017), Bayad scholar, doctor, professor, writer, historian.
David Nikitich Kugultinov
Jean Djorkaeff
Kirsan Ilyumzhinov
Ochirtu Khan
Kalev Pehme

See also
List of Mongolians
List of Buryats

References

 
Oirats